Taxes in Croatia are levied by both the central and the regional governments. Tax revenue in Croatia stood at 37.8% of GDP in 2017. The most important revenue sources are income taxes, social security contributions, corporate tax and the value added tax, which are all applied on the national level.

Income earned in Croatia is subject to a progressive income tax, of two different brackets.

In addition to tax, local government can collect surtax depending on the residence of taxpayer.

VAT in Croatia is levied at three different rates. The standard rate is 25 percent, two reduced rates are 13 and 5 percent apply on different goods and services. The 13% rate apply for newspapers, magazines, bread and milk; books and scientific journals, hotels and medicines.

Employment Income is subject to social security, at a rate of 16.5% for the employer and 20% for the employee.

Salary calculator: https://www.moj-posao.net/Salary-Calculator/

Corporate tax depends on the revenue the company earns.

Certain expenses are tax deductible for businesses including personal means of transportation. Resident businesses are taxed on worldwide income, while foreign companies in Croatia are taxed on profits earned in Croatia.

References

Further reading

Croatia
Economy of Croatia